Hemimerus hanseni is a species of earwig in the family Hemimeridae.

References

Further reading

 

Earwigs
Articles created by Qbugbot
Insects described in 1895